Agylla postfusca is a moth of the subfamily Arctiinae. It was described by George Hampson in 1894. It is found in the north-western Himalayas of India.

References

Moths described in 1894
postfusca
Moths of Asia